List of Statutory Rules and Orders of Northern Ireland is an incomplete list of Statutory Rules and Orders of Northern Ireland.

Statutory Rules and Orders were the predecessor of Statutory Rules and they formed the secondary legislation of Northern Ireland between 1922 and 1974.



1922

1923

1924

1925

1926

1927

1928

1930

1933
 Clay Works Welfare Order (Northern Ireland) 1933 S.R. & O. (N.I.) 1933 No. 59

1939
 Factories (Chains, Ropes and Lifting Tackle—Register) Order (Northern Ireland) 1939 S.R. & O. (N.I.) 1939 No. 66
 Factories (Sanitary Accommodation) Regulations (Northern Ireland) 1939 S.R. & O. (N.I.) 1939 No. 70
 Factories (Operations at Unfenced Machinery) Regulations (Northern Ireland) 1939 S.R. & O. (N.I.) 1939 No. 73

1945
 Electric Accumulator Special Regulations (Northern Ireland) 1945 S.R. & O. (N.I.) 1945 No. 41

1947
 Kiers Special Regulations (Northern Ireland) 1947 S.R. & O. (N.I.) 1947 No. 9

1950
 Dry Cleaning (Special Regulations) (Northern Ireland) 1950 S.R. & O. (N.I.) 1950 No. 117
ggg

1955
 Iron and Steel Foundries Regulations (Northern Ireland) 1955 S.R. & O. (N.I.) 1955 No. 193

1958
 Family Allowances, National Insurance and Industrial Injuries (Reciprocal Agreement with Norway) Order (Northern Ireland) 1958 S.R. & O. (N.I.) 1958 No. 59

1961
 Arsenic in Food Regulations (Northern Ireland) 1961 S.R. & O. (N.I.) 1961 No. 98

1962
 Family Allowances and National Insurance (Reciprocal Agreement with Australia) Order (Northern Ireland) 1962 S. R. & O. (N. I.) 1962 No. 218

1963
 Construction (Lifting Operations) Regulations (Northern Ireland) 1963 S.R. & O. (N.I.) 1963 No. 86
 Construction (General Provisions) Regulations (Northern Ireland) 1963 S.R. & O. (N.I.) 1963 No. 87
 Construction (Lifting Operations) Prescribed Particulars Order (Northern Ireland) 1963 S.R. & O. (N.I.) 1963 No. 130
 Construction (Lifting Operations) Certificates Order (Northern Ireland) 1963 S.R. & O. (N.I.) 1963 No. 131
 Construction (Lifting Operations) Reports Order (Northern Ireland) 1963 S.R. & O. (N.I.) 1963 No. 132
 Lifting Machines (Particulars of Examinations) Order (Northern Ireland) 1963 S.R. & O. (N.I.) 1963 No. 180

1964
 Factories (Cleanliness of Walls and Ceilings) Order (Northern Ireland) 1964 S.R. & O. (N.I.) 1964 No. 16
 Non-Ferrous Metals (Melting and Founding) Regulations (Northern Ireland) 1964 S.R. & O. (N.I.) 1964 No. 46
 National Insurance (Reciprocal Agreements with Australia and New Zealand) Order (Northern Ireland) 1964 S. R. & O. (N. I.) 1964 No. 85
 Food Hygiene (General) Regulations (Northern Ireland) 1964 S.R. & O. (N.I.) 1964 No. 129

1965
 Washing Facilities (Miscellaneous Industries) Regulations (Northern Ireland) 1965 S.R. & O. (N.I.) 1965 No. 275

1966
 Power Presses Regulations (Northern Ireland) 1966 S.R. & O. (N.I.) 1966 No. 311

1967
 Office and Shop Premises (Exemption) Order (Northern Ireland) 1967 S.R. & O. (N.I.) 1967 No. 68
 Construction (Lifting Operations) Certificates(Amendment) Order (Northern Ireland) 1967 S.R. & O. (N.I.) 1967 No. 132
 Docks Certificates Order (Northern Ireland) 1967 S.R. & O. (N.I.) 1967 No. 138
 Construction (Health and Welfare) Regulations (Northern Ireland) 1967 S.R. & O. (N.I.) 1967 No. 176
 Office and Shop Premises (Exemption) (No. 2) Order (Northern Ireland) 1967 S.R. & O. (N.I.) 1967 No. 186
 Office and Shop Premises (Washing Facilities) Regulations (Northern Ireland) 1967 S.R. & O. (N.I.) 1967 No. 188
 Office and Shop Premises (Sanitary Conveniences) Regulations (Northern Ireland) 1967 S.R. & O. (N.I.) 1967 No. 195
 Weights and Measures Regulations (Northern Ireland) 1967 S.R. and O.(N.I.) 1967 No. 637

1968
 Hoists and Lifts (Reports of Examinations) Order (Northern Ireland) 1968 S.R. & O. (N.I.) 1968 No. 229

1969
 Office and Shop Premises (Hoists and Lifts) Reports Order (Northern Ireland) 1969  S.R. & O. (N.I.) 1969 No. 27

1970
 Miscellaneous Mines (General) Regulations (Northern Ireland) 1970 S.R. & O. (N.I.) 1970 No. 104
 Coal and Other Mines (Sanitary Conveniences) Regulations (Northern Ireland) 1970 S.R. & O. (N.I.) 1970 No. 136

1971
 Abrasive Wheels Regulations (Northern Ireland) 1971 S.R. & O. (N.I.) 1971 No. 117
 Foundries (Protective Footwear and Gaiters) Regulations (Northern Ireland) 1971 S.R. & O. (N.I.) 1971 No. 248
 Diseases of Animals (Landing of Waste Foods) Order (Northern Ireland) 1971 S.R. & O. (N.I.) 1971 No. 353
 Shipbuilding and Ship-repairing Regulations (Northern Ireland) 1971 S.R. & O. (N.I.) 1971 No. 372

1972
 Department under the Diseases of Animals (Approval of Disinfectants) Order (Northern Ireland) 1972 S.R. & O. (N.I.) 1972 No. 16
 Pensions Increase (Annual Review) Order (Northern Ireland) 1972 S.R. & O. (N.I) 1972 No. 263
 European Communities (Food and Drugs) Order (Northern Ireland) 1972 S.R. & O. (N.I.)  1972 No. 363

1973
 Local Government (Modifications and Repeals of Health etc. Legislation) Order (Northern Ireland) 1973 S.R. & O. (N.I.)  1973 No. 211
 Pensions Increase (Annual Review) Order (Northern Ireland) 1973 S.R. & O. (N.I.) 1973 No. 364
 Petroleum (Liquid Methane) Order (Northern Ireland) 1973 S.R. & O. (N.I.) 1973 No. 528

See also

List of Statutory Rules of Northern Ireland

Lists of Statutory Rules of Northern Ireland